Herman Smith III (born January 25, 1971) is a former American professional football player who was a defensive end in the Canadian Football League (CFL), National Football League (NFL) and World League of American Football (WLAF). He played college football for Portland State University (PSU) and then professionally for the Hamilton Tiger-Cats and BC Lions of the CFL, London Monarchs of the WLAF and Tampa Bay Buccaneers of the NFL.

References

1971 births
Living people
American football defensive ends
American players of Canadian football
BC Lions players
Canadian football defensive linemen
Hamilton Tiger-Cats players
Merced Blue Devils football players
London Monarchs players
People from Mound Bayou, Mississippi
Portland State Vikings football players
Tampa Bay Buccaneers players